Built By Snow is an American four-piece rock band based in Austin, Texas formed in 2006.  To date, the band has released one EP, and one mini-full-length album. The band has described themselves as "Catchy keyboard indie pop rock with an explosion of velcro melodies and magnetic hooks that hit your brain like an Atari blasting out of a bazooka."

History
The band met while working together in the production department at a television station in Austin.  After winning a Battle of the Bands competition, they used the prize money to record their first EP, "NOISE."  Recorded during the summer months of 2007 at Music Lab Recording Studio in Austin Texas, "NOISE" is 7 powerpop songs about girls, teenage hope, dorks, NASA engineers, and robots.

During the summer months of 2008, Built By Snow began working on their second album, "MEGA."  Recorded at The Bubble in Austin Texas, "MEGA" is described as 9 songs of catchy keyboard rock with velcro melodies that will stick to your brain and won't let go.  Following the release of "MEGA," Built By Snow performed a showcase in the 2009 (SXSW) South By Southwest Music Festival in Austin, Texas,  and at the 2009 (NXNE) North By North East Music Festival in Toronto.

Musical style

Built By Snow is catchy rock/pop songs built around a wave of Moog synthesizers, circuit bending Casio Keyboards, and overdriven guitars.  Reviewers have compared their sound to the Cars, early Weezer and DEVO.

Music videos
The first video released by the band was for the track "Drag Away" from the EP NOISE.  The video, Directed by Andy Garibay is set inside of a station floating in deep space and follows a similar plot to 2001: A Space Odyssey.  The spaceship's on-board computer takes over and turns members JP and Matt into zombie robots, who fight Ben for control of the station.  This video won 3rd place in the Project Breakout online video contest.

In February 2008 the band released an animated music video for the track "Underneath' from the EP NOISE.  The video, Directed by Andy Garibay, was designed by Built By Snow guitarist Matt Murray who created a virtual 8-bit Nintendo video game world as the setting.  The band, acting as space pilots, was recorded in front of a green screen then superimposed into the video game setting.  Band members, JP, Matt, and Ben were the space pilot heroes in the video, while drummer Brandon played the bad guy.  The evil robots were all Brandon clones, and the flying Medusa head at the end of the video was also Brandon.

Discography

Albums

 MEGA (2009) self-released

EPs

 NOISE (2007) self-released

Side Projects
In 2011, Built By Snow singer and songwriter JP started releasing music under the name Oh Look Out. This side project contains songs written and recorded by JP in his home studio.

In 2010, Built By Snow guitarist Matt began playing with the Austin Texas band 'Red Falcon'.

References

External links
 Built By Snow (Official Site)
 Oh Look Out
 Red Falcon

American pop rock music groups
Indie rock musical groups from Texas
Musical groups from Austin, Texas